Grass-eater can refer to:
 Herbivore men or grasseaters, a Japanese person who is uninterested in sex
 Graminivore
 The Grass Eater, a 1961 film by John Hayes
 Redtop Grass Eaters, an Amerind tribe